Bodu 13 Muassasaa is a 2011 Maldivian political comedy short-film directed by Ahmed Falah. Produced by Afeef Production under Mohamed Afeef, the film stars Ismail Rasheed, Ahmed Asim, Aishath Rishmy and Fathimath Azifa in pivotal roles.

Premise
Dr. PD Mohamed Manik (Ismail Rasheed) and Azman (Ahmed Asim) representing the Bodu 13 Muassasaa, initiate the campaign program in Kaashi Capital City, for the 2013 Maldivian presidential election. Their initial meeting with the City Council went haywire due to Dr. PD's short temper. The priority to their promotion strategy becomes sidelined when they fall in love with Mariyam (Aishath Rishmy) and Sharu (Fathimath Azifa). Despite Dr. PD's several attempts to win Mariyam's love, she rejects all his offers citing her parents' disapproval to Dr. PD's philosophy and political ethics. Complications arise, when Dr. PD realizes that Mariyam's father is the Chief of City Council whom he had a fight during their initial meeting.

Cast 
 Ismail Rasheed as Dr. PD Mohamed Manik
 Ahmed Asim as Azman
 Aishath Rishmy as Mariyam
 Fathimath Azifa as Sharu
 Mohamed Sodhiq

Soundtrack

References

Maldivian short films
2011 short films
2011 films